Glen Nell is an unincorporated community in Washington Township, Jackson County, Ohio, United States.

History
Glen Nell was founded as a company town for the Glen Nell Coal Company.  The company mined coal at this location in a slope mine called the "Glen Nell Mine", later called the "Phoenix Mine", opened about 1890.  The Company also operated two drift mines nearby, called "Eclipse #1" and "Eclipse #2".  As of 1893, there were 15 miners, 8 day laborers, one Superintendent, and one Mine Boss employed at the mine and a spur of the CH&D Railroad leading to the location, but the mine was "long abandoned" by 1921.

There is a Wilcox Post Office listed as being "at the Glen Nell Coal Works", but no record of when it was established or discontinued.

References 

Unincorporated communities in Jackson County, Ohio